"Scandal" is a song by the British rock band Queen. It was released as the fourth single from their 1989 album The Miracle and peaked at #25 in the UK. The single was released in the United States but failed to chart.

Composition
"Scandal", written by Brian May, but credited to Queen, is about the unwanted attention May and lead singer Freddie Mercury received from the press in the late 1980s, involving May's divorce from his first wife, Chrissie Mullen, and his relationship with actress Anita Dobson and growing media speculation about Mercury's health. Mercury was diagnosed with AIDS in April 1987; he did not reveal his condition until the day before his death in November 1991. However, changes in his appearance, particularly his weight loss and rather gaunt look, helped fuel speculation that he was seriously ill.

Recording
May recorded the keyboards and guitars in one take. Mercury's vocal was also done in one take.

Music video
The video for the song featured the band performing on a stage designed to look like a newspaper - it was filmed at Pinewood Studios on 27 September 1989.

In the audio commentary included with the video in Queen: Greatest Video Hits 2, Roger Taylor admitted his dislike for it, stating it was “not one of my favourite songs. One of the most boring videos we ever made."

B-sides
The original version of the song "My Life Has Been Saved" was featured on the B-Side of the single, before May, Taylor, Deacon and Richards reworked the track for their fifteenth and final studio album Made in Heaven. The 1995 version replaced the original guitar intro with keyboards played by bassist John Deacon. The 12" and CD singles include the extended version of "Scandal" on the A-Side, while the B-Sides are both "My Life Has Been Saved" and the album version of "Scandal".

Track listings 
7" Single
 "Scandal" (Album Version) - 4:43
 "My Life Has Been Saved" - 3:15

12"/CD Single
 "Scandal" (Extended Version) - 6:23
 "My Life Has Been Saved" - 3:15
 "Scandal" (Album Version) - 4:43

Personnel

Freddie Mercury - vocals
Brian May - guitars, keyboards
Roger Taylor - drums, vibraslap
John Deacon - bass guitar
David Richards - synth bass, sampler

Charts

References

External links
 
 Lyrics at Queen official website

Queen (band) songs
1989 singles
Parlophone singles
Songs written by Brian May
Songs about the media
EMI Records singles
Capitol Records singles
Hollywood Records singles
1989 songs